Croton lindheimeri is a species of goatweed in the genus Croton.

References

lindheimeri
Flora of the Southeastern United States
Flora of Texas